Paragordionus is a genus of worms belonging to the family Chordodidae.

Species:

Paragordionus bohemicus 
Paragordionus dispar 
Paragordionus ibericus 
Paragordionus kawamurai

References

Nematomorpha